Mélanie Komzo is a Republic of the Congo politician. She is a member of the Pan-African Parliament.

References

Year of birth missing (living people)
Living people
Members of the Pan-African Parliament from the Republic of the Congo
21st-century Republic of the Congo women politicians
21st-century Republic of the Congo politicians
Women members of the Pan-African Parliament